Matinee Mouse is a 1966 Tom and Jerry compilation film short, featuring clips from several previous shorts from the Hanna-Barbera era. The story was supervised by Tom Ray, while founders of Hanna-Barbera and former MGM cartoon studio staff William Hanna and Joseph Barbera received a special director's credit.

Plot
Tom chases Jerry all over the house (clips from Love That Pup, The Flying Cat, Professor Tom, and The Missing Mouse) until Jerry gets back at Tom by beating him up to a pulp in the closet and throwing him out (which is a clip from Jerry and the Lion). As they both call a truce with white flags, both become even and start to walk happily along down the street, they stop by the local cinema, where they both notice a poster advertising their cartoons (implying that Tom and Jerry have occupations as actors). The man who is standing by the wall notices this cat and mouse. He looks up at the poster, then shrugs.

They walk in to watch the feature (clips from Love That Pup, Jerry's Diary, The Flying Sorceress, and The Truce Hurts), but every time they get thwarted or attacked in the movie, they always begin laughing, but cannot stop and then start beating up each other. Mild annoyance soon turns to violence in the seats, where Tom and Jerry continually slam the seats on each other. Eventually, the two call off their truce and start fighting each other aggressively in the seats. The onscreen characters in the fighting clip in 1948's The Truce Hurts (Tom, Jerry, and Spike the bulldog) pause their fight to watch Tom and Jerry in the audience fighting out in the seats.

Crew
Animation: Irven Spence, Ed Barge, Kenneth Muse, Ray Patterson & Lewis Marshall
Effects Animation: Al Grandmain
New Animation: Ken Harris, Don Towsley, Grant Simmons & Don Patterson
Layouts: Dick Bickenbach
Backgrounds: Robert Gentle
Written & Directed by William Hanna & Joseph Barbera
Music: Dean Elliott
Additional Layouts: Ernie Nordli
Additional Backgrounds: Philip DeGuard
Sound Editing: Lovell Norman
Produced by Fred Quimby, William Hanna, Joseph Barbera, Tom Ray & Chuck Jones
Story Directed and Supervised by: Tom Ray

Production notes
Matinee Mouse is the only Sib Tower 12 Tom and Jerry short that features Spike and Droopy.

In Matinee Mouse (and another compilation film, Shutter Bugged Cat), Tom and Jerry are animated using their original designs rather than the designs from the Chuck Jones shorts. However, due to differences in color processing and animation, the changes between Hanna/Barbera footage and Tom Ray footage are not entirely seamless.

External links

1966 films
1966 short films
1966 animated films
Animated films without speech
Films directed by Tom Ray
Short films directed by Joseph Barbera
Short films directed by William Hanna
Films set in a movie theatre
Tom and Jerry short films
1960s American animated films
1966 comedy films
Compilation films
Films scored by Dean Elliott
Metro-Goldwyn-Mayer short films
Metro-Goldwyn-Mayer animated short films
MGM Animation/Visual Arts short films
1960s English-language films